David Kipiani Stadium is mainly used by the club Alazani Gurjaani it is located in Boris Paichadze St, 1500, Gurjaani, Georgia.The field was named in honour of David Kipiani.

Description
David Kipiani Stadium is mainly used by the club Alazani Gurjaani. The biggest achievement was made in the 1992–93 season, when it took the 3rd place in the Umaglesi Liga. During that period the team was led by Otar Gabelia. The stadium is located in Boris Paichadze St, 1500, Gurjaani in Georgia and it was named in honour of David Kipiani.

Matches
After the collapse of the Soviet Union, on 17 September 1992 was held the friendly match between Georgia and Azerbaijan ended 6–3 with 3000 attendances. ref></ref>

See also
 Alazani Gurjaani

References

External links
 soccerway.com
 photos

Sports complexes
Sports venues built in the Soviet Union
Sports venues in Georgia (country)
Football venues in Georgia (country)
Georgia national football team